Hayes is a suburban area of southeast London, England and part of the London Borough of Bromley. An ancient parish in the county of Kent, Hayes was within the Orpington Urban District that became part of Greater London in 1965.

History

The ancient village

The name Hayes is recorded from 1177 as hoese from the Anglo-Saxon meaning "a settlement in open land overgrown with shrubs and rough bushes". The village stood at the junction of Hayes Lane, leading north to Bromley (one mile distant), and what is now known as Pickhurst Lane, leading west to West Wickham; the centre of the old village is now called Hayes Street. The village school was here, as is the parish church of St Mary the Virgin. Parts of the church date back to the thirteenth century, however it was subject to heavy restorations by George Gilbert Scott and John Oldrid Scott in the 19th century. The village's public house, also on Hayes Street, is called "The George" (first recorded 1759).) Hayes Street Farm, still shown on modern maps, is to the north of the village centre.

Both William Pitt the Elder, 1st Earl of Chatham (1708–1778), and William Pitt the Younger (1759–1806) lived at Hayes Place. The house dated back to the 15th century, was rebuilt in 1972, but then demolished in 1933 by the developer Henry Boot and the site redeveloped, but its occupants are remembered in such road names as Chatham and Pittsmead Avenues. Prior to being demolished, Hayes Place was owned by the Hambro family (of Hambros Bank fame) and a couple of roads bear the family names.

Although the parish church of Hayes can trace its history back over 800 years, and locals joined Jack Cade in his rebellion of 1450, the story of modern Hayes begins a little over a century ago, when Hayes became a popular place in which to live with bankers, stockbrokers and other City financiers buying property in the area. Development was aided when the branch railway from Elmers End, originally known as the West Wickham and Hayes Railway, was opened on 29 May 1882. Between 1801, when the population was just 382, and 1921, it had almost tripled to 1,010.

Modern suburban Hayes
Throughout the 20th century, the Hayes village area continued to grow and thrive. Further commercial development occurred on Station Approach because the increased traffic through the railway terminus created an incentive for growth. In the old village area ('Old Hayes'), the former village school was converted to a church hall when the local primary school opened in 1937; it lies along George Lane, which was further expanded at around the same time to facilitate further suburban housing developments.

To cope with the increase in commuter traffic, the station was rebuilt in 1935, and Station Approach became the main shopping area, including a Post Office, petrol station, two mini-supermarkets and numerous small shops. It also contains a public house called The New Inn.

During the Second World War an anti-aircraft gun battery was locally based on Hayes Common, and the soldiers of the 1st Canadian Division who manned it were barracked in local homes. Grandfields Nursery on West Common Road was hit by a V-2 rocket in the late afternoon of 9 February 1945, killing four people, including three members of the Grandfield family. Our Lady of the Rosary Catholic Church was later built on the site.

Much of the area to the west and north-west of the original village has been taken over by suburbia. West Wickham and Bromley are completely joined with Hayes; and Coney Hall estate, beyond the Orpington - Croydon road is also part of the pattern. To the east and south, however, the open space of Hayes Common precludes building of any kind.

The old village area along Hayes Street, also known as 'Old Hayes', today contains some small shops, though the local post office closed in 2004 (the nearest is now in the main shopping area near the station). The timbered cottage on the eastern side of Hayes Street was originally the village bakery, then it became a newsagents called "The Walnut Tree", until 2006, when it changed to residential use. The former village school remains a second village hall; the local primary school in George Lane has expanded in size in recent years, and now has three class groups in each year. It is extremely popular, and many of its pupils go on to Hayes School in West Common Road.

The shopping area in Old Hayes functions as a second hub for commercial businesses, running along Hayes street opposite the church building. It consists of the public house, "The George", a mini-market, several hairdressers, a cycle shop, two coffee shops and a fish and chip shop. Next to the church is the village public library, part of the Bromley Borough Libraries Service, occupying the old rectory building (since replaced by the new rectory). The library is surrounded by the library gardens, a small area of parkland containing tennis courts. On the north side of the church is Hayes Village Hall, built in 1927 by Hayes Community Council. This was led by Canon Thompson. It remains a hub of Village life.

Hayes Street Farm continues to play an important role in the village setting. Several public pathways and popular walking routes run through the farmland, and regular car boot sales are hosted on the farm fields.

There is a group called Hayes Village Association (HVA) which meet regularly to inform people about local issues. They regularly liaise with Bromley Council on planning matters and they give a voice to residents and businesses on a variety of issues. HVA produce a quarterly magazine with local interest articles and events, as well as details of businesses in the locality.

Sports and leisure

There are numerous playing fields and sports grounds around the periphery of Hayes: such as the Metropolitan Police Sports Ground at the Warren. It is also home, since 1927, to the world-famous Blackheath Harriers Athletics Club (now Blackheath and Bromley Harriers Athletic Club) at their clubhouse The Sydney Wooderson Centre.

Sports bodies based in the area include:
 Hayes Town FC (Formed 2016). Members of the Surrey South Eastern Combination, based at Coney Hall FC's Tiepigs Lane ground.
 Beccehamians RFC – a Rugby Union Club founded in 1933 plays competitive rugby at Sparrows Den at the bottom of Corkscrew Hill near West Wickham.
 Hayes Cricket Club, based at the Warman Sport ground.
 Bromley RFC – a Rugby union club started in 1886 and moved to Hayes Village in 1956 and are based at the Warman Sport ground.
 Norman Park Athletics Track –  one of the main athletics tracks in Bromley.
 Bromley F.C. – A football club based at the Hayes Lane Stadium.
 Hayes (Lawn) Tennis club, based at the Warman Sport ground.
 Old Wilsonians Sports Club - on fields formerly known as Hayes Hill Sports Ground.
 Urban Krav Maga based at the Old School.
 Bigfoot Cycle club.
 Roebucks Cricket Club, based at Burton Pynsent House.

Arts and culture
Cultural bodies in the area include:
 Hayes Philharmonic Choir - 1945 - May 2017.
 Allegri Singers - A Chamber choir created in 1981.
 Hayes Players - An Amateur theatre club founded in 1933.
Hayes Symphony Orchestra - A community orchestra, created in 1947, that has three concerts a year.

Transport

Rail
Hayes railway station is the terminus for Hayes line services operated by Southeastern to and from London Charing Cross and London Cannon Street stations.

Buses
Hayes is served by Transport for London bus routes 119 (24 hour service), 138, 146, 246, 314, 353 and 638.

These connect Hayes with areas including Biggin Hill, Bromley, Croydon, Eltham, New Addington, Orpington, West Wickham & Westerham.

Education 

 Hayes School - a mixed secondary school with academy status. Awarded WCSQM "World Class" status in October 2015.

Green spaces 

The area sits near the edge of the London conurbation and contains several parks, notably:
 Hayes Common - a 79 hectare area of public open land.
 Husseywell Park
 Coney Hall Recreation Ground
 Pickhurst Park
 The Knoll - an Ornamental Ground of four and a half hectares with lakes and specimen forest trees

Notable residents 
 Vicary Gibbs (1751-1820) -  judge and politician, buried at St Mary the Virgin churchyard.
 Christopher Greener (1943-2015) - actor and basketball player, lived for much of his life in Hayes.
 Everard Hambro (1842-1925) - banker and philanthropist, lived at Hayes Place.
 Thomas John Hussey (1792-1866) - local clergyman and astronomer, thought to be first person to suggest the existence of Neptune.
 John Ferguson McLennan (1827-1881) - advocate, social anthropologist and ethnologist, died in Hayes.
 William Pitt the Elder (1708-1778) - British Prime Minister, lived at Hayes Place.
 William Pitt the Younger (1759-1806) - British Prime Minister, born and grew up at Hayes Place.
 Pete Sears - musician, grew up in Hayes.

Gallery

Geography

References

Further reading 
Hayes: a History of a Kentish Village: Volume 1: The Stone Age to 1914 by Jean Wilson and Trevor Woodman  
Hayes: a History of a Kentish Village: Volume 2: 1914 to Modern Times by Jean Wilson and Trevor Woodman 
A History of Hayes in the County of Kent by H. P Thompson 

Areas of London
Districts of the London Borough of Bromley
Former civil parishes in the London Borough of Bromley